Ryonbong General Corp. (also known as Korea Ryonbong General Corporation, or Korea Yonbong General Corporation, or LYONGAKSAN GENERAL TRADING CORPORATION) is a North Korean government-owned corporation involved in the export of metals, minerals and machines. It has branch offices in many countries. It used to partially-own the Pyonghwa Motors car factory in Nampo in a joint venture with the Unification Church of South Korea before Pyonghwa becoming a part of the North Korean state.

Sanctions

The Ryonbong general Corp. is part of a UN weapon embargo since November 2006.

See also

 List of North Korean companies
 Economy of North Korea
Korea Pugang Corporation

References

External links
 in listed by UN official documention see Security Council committee determines items, designates entities subject To measures imposed in resolution 1718 (2006) SC/9642 

Government-owned companies of North Korea
Economy of North Korea